National Secondary Route 168, or just Route 168 (or ) is a National Road Route of Costa Rica, located in the Puntarenas province.

Description
In Puntarenas province the route covers Osa canton (Puerto Cortés district).

References

Highways in Costa Rica